Mahmud ibn Husayn ibn Muhammed al-Kashgari was an 11th-century Kara-Khanid scholar and lexicographer of the Turkic languages from Kashgar.

His father, Husayn, was the mayor of Barsgan, a town in the southeastern part of the lake of Issyk-Kul (nowadays village of Barskoon in Northern Kyrgyzstan's Issyk-Kul Region) and related to the ruling dynasty of Kara-Khanid Khanate.

Work

It was intended for use by the Abbasid Caliphate, the new Arab allies of the Turks. Mahmud Kashgari's comprehensive dictionary, later edited by the Turkish historian, Ali Amiri, contains specimens of old Turkic poetry in the typical form of quatrains (Persio-Arabic , rubā'iyāt), representing all the principal genres: epic, pastoral, didactic, lyric and elegiac. His book also included the first known map of the areas inhabited by Turkic peoples. This map is housed at the National Library in Istanbul.

Dīwān Lughāt al-Turk also contains linguistic data about multiple Turkic dialects that may have been gathered from merchants and others involved in trade along routes that travelled through the Oguz steppe. The origin of the compiled information is not known. Scholars believe it is likely that Kashgari would have gathered most of the content about Oguz-Turkmen from Oguz tribes in Khorasan, since he himself was a student in Seljuk Baghdad, but it is possible that some of this material could have come from early Turkmen. Scholars have not yet come to a settled conclusion, however.

Al-Kashgari advocated monolingualism and the linguistic purism of the Turkic languages and held a belief in the superiority of nomadic people (the Turkic tribes had traditionally been nomads) over urban populations. Most of his Turkic-speaking contemporaries were bilingual in Tajik (a Persian language), which was then the urban and literary language of Central Asia.

Even so, Kashgari praised the dialect spoken by the bilingual Uyghurs as "pure" and "most correct" on par with those of Turkic monolinguals.

The non-Muslim Turks worship of Tengri was mocked and insulted by the Muslim Turk Mahmud al-Kashgari, who wrote a verse referring to them – The Infidels – May God destroy them!

Kashgari claimed that the Prophet assisted in a miraculous event where 700,000 Yabāqu "infidels" were defeated by 40,000 Muslims led by Arslān Tegīn claiming that fires shot sparks from gates located on a green mountain towards the Yabāqu. The Yabaqu were a Turkic people.

Muslims used to call the Uyghur Buddhists as "Tats", which referred to the "Uighur infidels" according to the Tuxsi and Taghma, while other Turks called Persians "Tat". Uyghur Buddhists used to call the Muslims as "Chomak" While Kashgari displayed a different attitude towards the Turks diviners beliefs and "national customs", he expressed towards Buddhism a hatred in his Diwan where he wrote the verse cycle on the war against Uighur Buddhists. Buddhist origin words like toyin (a cleric or priest) and Burxān or Furxan (meaning Buddha, acquiring the generic meaning of "idol" in the Turkic language of Kashgari) had negative connotations to Muslim Turks.

The Muslim writer Mahmud al-Kashgari had some more information about China in his writings. Mahmud al-Kashgari viewed Kashgar as a part of China, as Tang China had controlled Kashgar as one of the Anxi protectorate's "Four Garrisons" seats.  
Tabgach, originally denoting the Northern Wei's dynastic clan Tuoba, referred metonymously to China in Kashgari's time, Khitay to the Khitans (Liao dynasty). Persian chīn and māchīn (چين ماچين) and Arabic ṣīn and māṣīn (صين ماصين) were names for China: after the Tang dynasty, Southern China was referred to as Machin-Masin and Northern China as Chin-Sin; although before that the names' referents were reversed.

Al-Kashgari cautioned against the assimilation of the Nomadic way of life into sedentary culture. He recorded a Turkic proverb that warned, “Just as the effectiveness of a warrior is diminished when his sword begins to rust, so too does the flesh of a Turk begin to rot when he assumes the lifestyle of an Iranian.”

Death
Some researchers think that Mahmud al-Kashgari died in 1102 at the age of 97 in Upal, a small city southwest of Kashgar, and was buried there. There is now a mausoleum erected on his gravesite. But some modern authors reject this assertion, saying that the date of his death is just unknown.

Legacy
He is claimed by Uyghur, Kyrgyz, and Uzbek nationalists as part of their respective ethnic groups.

An oriental study university, situated in the capital city of Bishkek in post-Soviet Kyrgyzstan, was named after Makhmud Kashghari, in the 1990s.

UNESCO declared 2008 the Year of Mahmud al-Kashgari.

See also
 Yusuf Khass Hajib

Notes

References

Svat Soucek, A History of Inner Asia, Cambridge University Press, 2002.

External links
 
In Marco Polo's Footsteps by John F. Burns of New York Times
Divanu Lugati-t Türk Dizini (Turkish)
ar.wikisource.org (PDF)
كتاب ديوان لغات الترك

Medieval linguists
11th-century writers
1005 births
1102 deaths
Geographers of the medieval Islamic world
11th-century geographers
Medieval Turkic geographers
Anti-Buddhism
Persecution of Buddhists
Linguists of Turkic languages